The Boerdijk–Coxeter helix, named after H. S. M. Coxeter and A. H. Boerdijk, is a linear stacking of regular tetrahedra, arranged so that the edges of the complex that belong to only one tetrahedron form three intertwined helices. There are two chiral forms, with either clockwise or counterclockwise windings. Unlike any other stacking of Platonic solids, the Boerdijk–Coxeter helix is not rotationally repetitive in 3-dimensional space. Even in an infinite string of stacked tetrahedra, no two tetrahedra will have the same orientation, because the helical pitch per cell is not a rational fraction of the circle. However, modified forms of this helix have been found which are rotationally repetitive, and in 4-dimensional space this helix repeats in rings of exactly 30 tetrahedral cells that tessellate the 3-sphere surface of the 600-cell, one of the six regular convex polychora.

Buckminster Fuller named it a tetrahelix and considered them with regular and irregular tetrahedral elements.

Geometry 
The coordinates of vertices of Boerdijk–Coxeter helix composed of tetrahedrons with unit edge length can be written in the form

 
The two different values of  correspond to two chiral forms. All vertices are located on the cylinder with radius  along z-axis. Given how the tetrahedra alternate, this gives an apparent twist of  every two tetrahedra. There is another inscribed cylinder with radius  inside the helix.

Higher-dimensional geometry

The 600-cell partitions into 20 rings of 30 tetrahedra, each a Boerdijk–Coxeter helix. When superimposed onto the 3-sphere curvature it becomes periodic, with a period of ten vertices, encompassing all 30 cells. The collective of such helices in the 600-cell represent a discrete Hopf fibration. While in 3 dimensions the edges are helices, in the imposed 3-sphere topology they are geodesics and have no torsion. They spiral around each other naturally due to the Hopf fibration. The collective of edges forms another discrete Hopf fibration of 12 rings with 10 vertices each. These correspond to rings of 10 dodecahedrons in the dual 120-cell.

In addition, the 16-cell partitions into two 8-tetrahedron rings, four edges long, and the 5-cell partitions into a single degenerate 5-tetrahedron ring.

Related polyhedral helixes 
Equilateral square pyramids can also be chained together as a helix, with two vertex configurations, 3.4.3.4 and 3.3.4.3.3.4. This helix exists as finite ring of 30 pyramids in a 4-dimensional polytope.

And equilateral pentagonal pyramids can be chained with 3 vertex configurations, 3.3.5, 3.5.3.5, and 3.3.3.5.3.3.5:

In architecture 
The Art Tower Mito is based on a Boerdijk–Coxeter helix.

See also 
 Clifford parallel cell rings
 Toroidal polyhedron
 Line group#Helical symmetry
 Skew apeirogon#Helical apeirogons in 3-dimensions

Notes

References

External links 
 Boerdijk-Coxeter helix animation
 http://www.rwgrayprojects.com/rbfnotes/helix/helix01.html

Helices
Polyhedra